Acacia gonoclada, also known as ganambureng, is a tree or shrub belonging to the genus Acacia and the subgenus Juliflorae that is endemic to northern Australia.

Description
It has smooth, red-brown or grey coloured bark and angular olive-green to brown branchlets. Like most species of Acacia it has phyllodes rather than true leaves. They are narrowed and curved upwards toward the base and have two or three obvious main veins. It blooms from May to September producing yellow flowers. The flat and linear seed pods that form after flowering are clustered in the upper axils.

Taxonomy
The species was first formally described by the botanist Ferdinand von Mueller in 1859 as part of the work Contributiones ad Acaciarum Australiae Cognitionem as published in the Journal of the Proceedings of the Linnean Society, Botany. It was reclassified as Racosperma gonocladum by Leslie Pedley in 1987 then transferred back to genus Acacia in 2001.

Distribution
It is native to an area in the Kimberley region of Western Australia across the top end of the Northern Territory and central Queensland. It is found in tropical areas and grows in shallow stony soils and loamy soils.

See also
 List of Acacia species

References

gonoclada
Acacias of Western Australia
Flora of the Northern Territory
Flora of Queensland
Taxa named by Ferdinand von Mueller
Plants described in 1859